The Stadio di Corso Marsiglia (officially Campo Juventus) was a multisports stadium located in Turin (Italy). It was designed by architect Amedeo Lavini.

The first Italian sportive stadium with artificial light and built in reinforced concrete, it was home to Italian giants Foot-Ball Club Juventus between 1922 (The first game played at Corso Marsiglia was between Juventus and Modena for the Federal Championship, which the Torinese side won 4–0) and 1933, the year in which Juventus transferred to Stadio Mussolini. During these years the club won four national titles, including winning three consecutively (1926, 1931, 1932 and 1933).

References

Buildings and structures in Turin
Juventus F.C.
Corso Marsiglia
Corso
Sports venues in Turin
1923 establishments in Italy
Sports venues completed in 1923
Sports venues demolished in 1939
1939 disestablishments in Italy